This is a list of butterflies of Malawi. About 488 species are known from Malawi, 16 of which are endemic.

Papilionidae

Papilioninae

Papilionini
Papilio nireus lyaeus Doubleday, 1845
Papilio desmondi usambaraensis (Koçak, 1980)
Papilio thuraui thuraui Karsch, 1900
Papilio thuraui cyclopis Rothschild & Jordan, 1903
Papilio thuraui heathi (Hancock, 1984)
Papilio thuraui occidua Storace, 1951
Papilio dardanus tibullus Kirby, 1880
Papilio constantinus Ward, 1871
Papilio phorcas nyikanus Rothschild & Jordan, 1903
Papilio echerioides shirensis (Hancock, 1987)
Papilio fuelleborni Karsch, 1900
Papilio jacksoni nyika Cottrell, 1963
Papilio pelodurus pelodurus Butler, 1896
Papilio pelodurus vesper Le Cerf, 1924
Papilio ophidicephalus mkuwadzi Gifford, 1961
Papilio ophidicephalus niassicola Storace, 1955
Papilio mackinnoni isokae (Hancock, 1984)

Leptocercini
Graphium antheus (Cramer, 1779)
Graphium policenes (Cramer, 1775)
Graphium polistratus (Grose-Smith, 1889)
Graphium colonna (Ward, 1873)
Graphium porthaon (Hewitson, 1865)
Graphium angolanus (Goeze, 1779)
Graphium morania (Angas, 1849)
Graphium taboranus (Oberthür, 1886)
Graphium leonidas (Fabricius, 1793)
Graphium philonoe (Ward, 1873)

Pieridae

Coliadinae
Eurema brigitta (Stoll, [1780])
Eurema mandarinula (Holland, 1892)
Eurema hecabe solifera (Butler, 1875)
Catopsilia florella (Fabricius, 1775)
Colias electo hecate Strecker, 1905
Colias electo pseudohecate Berger, 1940
Colias mukana jolyi Verhulst, 2006

Pierinae
Colotis antevippe gavisa (Wallengren, 1857)
Colotis aurigineus (Butler, 1883)
Colotis celimene (Lucas, 1852)
Colotis danae annae (Wallengren, 1857)
Colotis dissociatus (Butler, 1897)
Colotis euippe omphale (Godart, 1819)
Colotis evenina casta (Gerstaecker, 1871)
Colotis hildebrandtii (Staudinger, 1884)
Colotis pallene (Hopffer, 1855)
Colotis regina (Trimen, 1863)
Colotis vesta mutans (Butler, 1877)
Colotis subfasciatus ducissa (Dognin, 1891)
Pinacopterix eriphia (Godart, [1819])
Nepheronia argia mhondana (Suffert, 1904)
Nepheronia thalassina sinalata (Suffert, 1904)

Pierini
Appias phaola isokani (Grose-Smith, 1889)
Appias sabina phoebe (Butler, 1901)
Appias sylvia nyasana (Butler, 1897)
Mylothris agathina (Cramer, 1779)
Mylothris crawshayi Butler, 1896
Mylothris rubricosta attenuata Talbot, 1944
Mylothris rueppellii rhodesiana Riley, 1921
Mylothris sagala dentatus Butler, 1896
Mylothris similis Lathy, 1906
Mylothris yulei Butler, 1897
Dixeia doxo parva Talbot, 1943
Belenois aurota (Fabricius, 1793)
Belenois calypso crawshayi Butler, 1894
Belenois creona severina (Stoll, 1781)
Belenois rubrosignata kongwana Talbot, 1943
Belenois thysa (Hopffer, 1855)
Belenois welwitschii Rogenhofer, 1890
Belenois zochalia agrippinides (Holland, 1896)

Lycaenidae

Miletinae

Liphyrini
Aslauga latifurca Cottrell, 1981
Aslauga marshalli Butler, 1899

Miletini
Spalgis lemolea Druce, 1890
Lachnocnema bibulus (Fabricius, 1793)
Lachnocnema pseudobibulus Libert, 1996
Lachnocnema durbani Trimen & Bowker, 1887
Lachnocnema brimoides Libert, 1996

Poritiinae

Liptenini
Alaena amazoula nyasana Hawker-Smith, 1933
Alaena lamborni Gifford, 1965
Alaena nyassa Hewitson, 1877
Alaena ochracea Gifford, 1965
Alaena picata interrupta Hawker-Smith, 1933
Alaena reticulata Butler, 1896
Pentila carcassoni Stempffer & Bennett, 1961
Pentila pauli nyassana Aurivillius, 1899
Pentila tropicalis fuscipunctata Henning & Henning, 1994
Ornipholidotos peucetia (Hewitson, 1866)
Cooksonia aliciae Talbot, 1935
Mimacraea costleyi Druce, 1912
Mimacraea marshalli Trimen, 1898
Teriomima puella Kirby, 1887
Teriomima puellaris (Trimen, 1894)
Baliochila neavei Stempffer & Bennett, 1953
Baliochila hildegarda (Kirby, 1887)
Baliochila lipara Stempffer & Bennett, 1953
Baliochila nyasae Stempffer & Bennett, 1953
Baliochila woodi (Riley, 1943)
Cnodontes vansomereni Stempffer & Bennett, 1953

Epitolini
Deloneura ochrascens littoralis Talbot, 1935
Deloneura subfusca Hawker-Smith, 1933

Aphnaeinae
Lipaphnaeus aderna spindasoides (Aurivillius, 1916)
Chloroselas pseudozeritis (Trimen, 1873)
Crudaria leroma (Wallengren, 1857)
Cigaritis apelles (Oberthür, 1878)
Cigaritis ella (Hewitson, 1865)
Cigaritis homeyeri (Dewitz, 1887)
Cigaritis natalensis (Westwood, 1851)
Cigaritis nyassae (Butler, 1884)
Cigaritis phanes (Trimen, 1873)
Cigaritis trimeni (Neave, 1910)
Cigaritis victoriae (Butler, 1884)
Axiocerses tjoane (Wallengren, 1857)
Axiocerses nyika Quickelberge, 1984
Axiocerses coalescens Henning & Henning, 1996
Axiocerses karinae Henning & Henning, 1996
Axiocerses bamptoni Henning & Henning, 1996
Axiocerses amanga (Westwood, 1881)
Axiocerses punicea (Grose-Smith, 1889)
Aloeides conradsi angoniensis Tite & Dickson, 1973
Aloeides molomo handmani Tite & Dickson, 1973
Aphnaeus erikssoni rex Aurivillius, 1909
Aphnaeus flavescens Stempffer, 1954
Aphnaeus hutchinsonii Trimen & Bowker, 1887

Theclinae
Myrina dermaptera nyassae Talbot, 1935
Hypolycaena auricostalis (Butler, 1897)
Hypolycaena buxtoni Hewitson, 1874
Hypolycaena hatita japhusa Riley, 1921
Hypolycaena lochmophila Tite, 1967
Hypolycaena pachalica Butler, 1888
Leptomyrina hirundo (Wallengren, 1857)
Leptomyrina handmani Gifford, 1965
Iolaus alienus Trimen, 1898
Iolaus bakeri (Riley, 1928)
Iolaus congdoni (Kielland, 1985)
Iolaus handmani (Gifford, 1965)
Iolaus mimosae rhodosense (Stempffer & Bennett, 1959)
Iolaus nasisii (Riley, 1928)
Iolaus sidus Trimen, 1864
Iolaus violacea (Riley, 1928)
Iolaus trimeni Wallengren, 1875
Iolaus lalos (Druce, 1896)
Iolaus ndolae (Stempffer & Bennett, 1958)
Iolaus silarus Druce, 1885
Stugeta bowkeri nyasana Talbot, 1935
Pilodeudorix kafuensis (Neave, 1910)
Pilodeudorix camerona katanga (Clench, 1965)
Pilodeudorix zeloides (Butler, 1901)
Deudorix caliginosa Lathy, 1903
Deudorix dariaves Hewitson, 1877
Deudorix dinochares Grose-Smith, 1887
Deudorix dinomenes Grose-Smith, 1887
Deudorix diocles Hewitson, 1869
Deudorix ecaudata Gifford, 1963
Deudorix lorisona coffea Jackson, 1966
Deudorix magda Gifford, 1963
Deudorix montana (Kielland, 1985)
Deudorix vansoni Pennington, 1948
Capys brunneus Aurivillius, 1916
Capys catharus Riley, 1932
Capys connexivus Butler, 1897

Polyommatinae

Lycaenesthini
Anthene butleri livida (Trimen, 1881)
Anthene chirinda (Bethune-Baker, 1910)
Anthene contrastata mashuna (Stevenson, 1937)
Anthene crawshayi (Butler, 1899)
Anthene kersteni (Gerstaecker, 1871)
Anthene lasti (Grose-Smith & Kirby, 1894)
Anthene lemnos (Hewitson, 1878)
Anthene ligures (Hewitson, 1874)
Anthene liodes (Hewitson, 1874)
Anthene nigropunctata (Bethune-Baker, 1910)
Anthene otacilia (Trimen, 1868)
Anthene rubricinctus anadema (Druce, 1905)
Anthene nigeriae (Aurivillius, 1905)
Lycaena phlaeas abbottii (Holland, 1892)

Polyommatini
Uranothauma antinorii felthami (Stevenson, 1934)
Uranothauma confusa Kielland, 1989
Uranothauma crawshayi Butler, 1895
Uranothauma cuneatum Tite, 1958
Uranothauma falkensteini (Dewitz, 1879)
Uranothauma heritsia virgo (Butler, 1896)
Uranothauma poggei (Dewitz, 1879)
Uranothauma uganda Kielland, 1980
Uranothauma vansomereni Stempffer, 1951
Uranothauma williamsi Carcasson, 1961
Cacyreus virilis Stempffer, 1936
Harpendyreus hazelae Stempffer, 1973
Harpendyreus juno (Butler, 1897)
Tuxentius calice (Hopffer, 1855)
Tuxentius ertli (Aurivillius, 1907)
Tuxentius melaena (Trimen & Bowker, 1887)
Tarucus sybaris (Hopffer, 1855)
Zintha hintza (Trimen, 1864)
Actizera stellata (Trimen, 1883)
Eicochrysops messapus mahallakoaena (Wallengren, 1857)
Euchrysops barkeri (Trimen, 1893)
Euchrysops subpallida Bethune-Baker, 1923
Euchrysops unigemmata (Butler, 1895)
Thermoniphas colorata (Ungemach, 1932)
Oboronia bueronica Karsch, 1895
Lepidochrysops aethiopia (Bethune-Baker, [1923])
Lepidochrysops auratus Quickelberge, 1979
Lepidochrysops chalceus Quickelberge, 1979
Lepidochrysops chloauges (Bethune-Baker, [1923])
Lepidochrysops delicata (Bethune-Baker, [1923])
Lepidochrysops desmondi Stempffer, 1951
Lepidochrysops dollmani (Bethune-Baker, [1923])
Lepidochrysops glauca (Trimen & Bowker, 1887)
Lepidochrysops handmani Quickelberge, 1980
Lepidochrysops intermedia intermedia (Bethune-Baker, [1923])
Lepidochrysops intermedia cottrelli Stempffer, 1954
Lepidochrysops kocak Seven, 1997
Lepidochrysops longifalces Tite, 1961
Lepidochrysops loveni (Aurivillius, 1922)
Lepidochrysops neavei neavei (Bethune-Baker, [1923])
Lepidochrysops neavei nolani Williams, 2002
Lepidochrysops nyika Tite, 1961
Lepidochrysops pampolis (Druce, 1905)
Lepidochrysops patricia (Trimen & Bowker, 1887)
Lepidochrysops peculiaris hypoleucus (Butler, 1893)
Lepidochrysops plebeia (Butler, 1898)
Lepidochrysops solwezii (Bethune-Baker, [1923])

Riodinidae

Nemeobiinae
Abisara delicata Lathy, 1901

Nymphalidae

Libytheinae
Libythea labdaca laius Trimen, 1879

Danainae

Danaini
Danaus chrysippus orientis (Aurivillius, 1909)
Tirumala petiverana (Doubleday, 1847)
Amauris niavius dominicanus Trimen, 1879
Amauris tartarea damoclides Staudinger, 1896
Amauris albimaculata latifascia Talbot, 1940
Amauris crawshayi Butler, 1897
Amauris echeria lobengula (Sharpe, 1890)
Amauris echeria serica Talbot, 1940
Amauris echeria whytei Butler, 1894
Amauris ellioti junia (Le Cerf, 1920)
Amauris ochlea ochlea (Boisduval, 1847)
Amauris ochlea bumilleri Lanz, 1896

Satyrinae

Melanitini
Gnophodes betsimena diversa (Butler, 1880)
Melanitis libya Distant, 1882
Aphysoneura pigmentaria latilimba Le Cerf, 1919
Aphysoneura pigmentaria obnubila Riley, 1923

Satyrini
Bicyclus angulosa selousi (Trimen, 1895)
Bicyclus anynana (Butler, 1879)
Bicyclus campina (Aurivillius, 1901)
Bicyclus cottrelli (van Son, 1952)
Bicyclus ena (Hewitson, 1877)
Bicyclus simulacris Kielland, 1990
Bicyclus vansoni Condamin, 1965
Heteropsis perspicua (Trimen, 1873)
Heteropsis simonsii (Butler, 1877)
Heteropsis ubenica (Thurau, 1903)
Ypthima condamini Kielland, 1982
Ypthima granulosa Butler, 1883
Ypthima pupillaris obscurata Kielland, 1982
Neocoenyra bioculata bioculata Carcasson, 1964
Neocoenyra bioculata murphyi Collins, 1997
Neocoenyra fulleborni Thurau, 1903
Neocoenyra kivuensis Seydel, 1929
Neocoenyra paralellopupillata (Karsch, 1897)
Neocoenyra ypthimoides Butler, 1894
Coenyropsis bera (Hewitson, 1877)
Physcaeneura pione Godman, 1880
Neita extensa (Butler, 1898)

Charaxinae

Charaxini
Charaxes acuminatus acuminatus Thurau, 1903
Charaxes acuminatus mlanji van Someren, 1963
Charaxes acuminatus nyika van Someren, 1963
Charaxes protoclea azota (Hewitson, 1877)
Charaxes macclounii Butler, 1895
Charaxes saturnus Butler, 1866
Charaxes castor flavifasciatus Butler, 1895
Charaxes brutus natalensis Staudinger, 1885
Charaxes ansorgei levicki Poulton, 1933
Charaxes pollux geminus Rothschild, 1900
Charaxes dowsetti Henning, 1989
Charaxes druceanus proximans Joicey & Talbot, 1922
Charaxes bohemani Felder & Felder, 1859
Charaxes xiphares ludovici Rousseau-Decelle, 1933
Charaxes xiphares woodi van Someren, 1964
Charaxes cithaeron nyasae van Someren, 1964
Charaxes violetta melloni Fox, 1963
Charaxes ameliae amelina Joicey & Talbot, 1925
Charaxes pythodoris ventersi Henning, 1982
Charaxes etesipe tavetensis Rothschild, 1894
Charaxes penricei Rothschild, 1900
Charaxes achaemenes Felder & Felder, 1867
Charaxes jahlusa argynnides Westwood, 1864
Charaxes eupale veneris White & Grant, 1989
Charaxes dilutus dilutus Rothschild, 1898
Charaxes dilutus kasitu White & Grant, 1989
Charaxes baumanni whytei Butler, 1894
Charaxes nyikensis van Someren, 1975
Charaxes ethalion handmani Henning, 1982
Charaxes ethalion kitungulensis Strand, 1911
Charaxes chintechi van Someren, 1975
Charaxes phaeus Hewitson, 1877
Charaxes fionae Henning, 1977
Charaxes aubyni australis van Someren & Jackson, 1957
Charaxes martini martini van Someren, 1966
Charaxes martini helenae Henning, 1982
Charaxes guderiana (Dewitz, 1879)
Charaxes zoolina (Westwood, [1850])
Charaxes nichetes leoninus Butler, 1895

Euxanthini
Charaxes wakefieldi (Ward, 1873)

Apaturinae
Apaturopsis cleochares schultzei Schmidt, 1921

Nymphalinae

Nymphalini
Antanartia schaeneia dubia Howarth, 1966
Vanessa dimorphica (Howarth, 1966)
Junonia artaxia Hewitson, 1864
Junonia natalica (Felder & Felder, 1860)
Junonia sophia infracta Butler, 1888
Junonia terea elgiva Hewitson, 1864
Salamis cacta eileenae Henning & Joannou, 1994
Protogoniomorpha parhassus (Drury, 1782)
Precis actia Distant, 1880
Precis cuama (Hewitson, 1864)
Precis sinuata Plötz, 1880
Precis tugela aurorina (Butler, 1894)
Hypolimnas deceptor (Trimen, 1873)
Hypolimnas misippus (Linnaeus, 1764)

Cyrestinae

Cyrestini
Cyrestis camillus sublineata Lathy, 1901

Biblidinae

Biblidini
Neptidopsis ophione nucleata Grünberg, 1911
Eurytela dryope angulata Aurivillius, 1899
Eurytela hiarbas lita Rothschild & Jordan, 1903

Epicaliini
Sevenia boisduvali (Wallengren, 1857)
Sevenia morantii (Trimen, 1881)
Sevenia pechueli rhodesiana (Rothschild, 1918)
Sevenia rosa (Hewitson, 1877)

Limenitinae

Limenitidini
Harma theobene superna (Fox, 1968)
Cymothoe coranus dowsetti Beaurain, 1988
Cymothoe coranus murphyi Beaurain, 1988
Cymothoe cottrelli Rydon, 1980
Cymothoe melanjae Bethune-Baker, 1926
Cymothoe zombana Bethune-Baker, 1926
Pseudacraea boisduvalii trimenii Butler, 1874
Pseudacraea deludens deludens Neave, 1912
Pseudacraea deludens murphyi Hecq, 1991
Pseudacraea eurytus conradti Oberthür, 1893
Pseudacraea lucretia expansa (Butler, 1878)
Pseudacraea poggei (Dewitz, 1879)

Neptidini
Neptis alta Overlaet, 1955
Neptis aurivillii Schultze, 1913
Neptis carcassoni Van Son, 1959
Neptis incongrua Butler, 1896
Neptis jordani Neave, 1910
Neptis kiriakoffi Overlaet, 1955
Neptis swynnertoni Trimen, 1912
Neptis trigonophora Butler, 1878

Adoliadini
Catuna sikorana Rogenhofer, 1889
Euryphura achlys (Hopffer, 1855)
Euryphura concordia (Hopffer, 1855)
Pseudargynnis hegemone (Godart, 1819)
Aterica galene theophane Hopffer, 1855
Bebearia orientis malawiensis Holmes, 2001
Euphaedra zaddachii crawshayi Butler, 1895
Euphaedra nigrobasalis ceramica Hecq, 1991
Euphaedra orientalis Rothschild, 1898
Euphaedra murphyi Hecq, 1991
Euphaedra neophron (Hopffer, 1855)
Euptera kinugnana (Grose-Smith, 1889)

Heliconiinae

Acraeini
Acraea acara Hewitson, 1865
Acraea anemosa Hewitson, 1865
Acraea boopis choloui Pierre, 1979
Acraea cuva Grose-Smith, 1889
Acraea insignis Distant, 1880
Acraea machequena Grose-Smith, 1887
Acraea neobule Doubleday, 1847
Acraea pseudolycia astrigera Butler, 1899
Acraea quirina rosa Eltringham, 1912
Acraea rabbaiae perlucida Henning & Henning, 1996
Acraea zetes (Linnaeus, 1758)
Acraea zonata Hewitson, 1877
Acraea acrita Hewitson, 1865
Acraea asema Hewitson, 1877
Acraea chaeribula Oberthür, 1893
Acraea chambezi Neave, 1910
Acraea egina areca Mabille, 1889
Acraea periphanes Oberthür, 1893
Acraea petraea Boisduval, 1847
Acraea punctellata Eltringham, 1912
Acraea atergatis Westwood, 1881
Acraea axina Westwood, 1881
Acraea caecilia pudora Aurivillius, 1910
Acraea caldarena Hewitson, 1877
Acraea leucopyga Aurivillius, 1904
Acraea pudorella Aurivillius, 1899
Acraea aganice nicega (Suffert, 1904)
Acraea aganice nyassae (Carpenter, 1920)
Acraea epaea melina (Thurau, 1903)
Acraea scalivittata (Butler, 1896)
Acraea acuta Howarth, 1969
Acraea alicia (Sharpe, 1890)
Acraea baxteri Sharpe, 1902
Acraea cabira Hopffer, 1855
Acraea encedana Pierre, 1976
Acraea serena (Fabricius, 1775)
Acraea esebria Hewitson, 1861
Acraea goetzei Thurau, 1903
Acraea johnstoni Godman, 1885
Acraea burni Butler, 1896
Acraea pentapolis epidica Oberthür, 1893
Acraea pharsalus pharsaloides Holland, 1892
Acraea sotikensis Sharpe, 1892
Acraea ventura Hewitson, 1877
Acraea bomba Grose-Smith, 1889
Acraea induna Trimen, 1895
Acraea parei orangica (Henning & Henning, 1996)
Acraea rahira Boisduval, 1833
Acraea igola Trimen & Bowker, 1889
Acraea perenna thesprio Oberthür, 1893

Argynnini
Issoria smaragdifera (Butler, 1895)

Vagrantini
Phalanta eurytis (Doubleday, 1847)
Phalanta phalantha aethiopica (Rothschild & Jordan, 1903)

Hesperiidae

Coeliadinae
Coeliades forestan (Stoll, [1782])
Coeliades pisistratus (Fabricius, 1793)
Coeliades sejuncta (Mabille & Vuillot, 1891)

Pyrginae

Celaenorrhinini
Celaenorrhinus galenus biseriata (Butler, 1888)
Celaenorrhinus handmani Collins & Congdon, 1998
Celaenorrhinus zanqua Evans, 1937
Eretis djaelaelae (Wallengren, 1857)
Eretis melania Mabille, 1891
Eretis umbra nox (Neave, 1910)
Sarangesa astrigera Butler, 1894
Sarangesa haplopa Swinhoe, 1907
Sarangesa laelius (Mabille, 1877)
Sarangesa lucidella (Mabille, 1891)
Sarangesa maculata (Mabille, 1891)
Sarangesa ruona Evans, 1937
Sarangesa seineri Strand, 1909

Tagiadini
Tagiades flesus (Fabricius, 1781)
Eagris nottoana (Wallengren, 1857)
Eagris sabadius ochreana Lathy, 1901
Calleagris hollandi (Butler, 1897)
Calleagris jamesoni (Sharpe, 1890)
Caprona adelica Karsch, 1892
Netrobalane canopus (Trimen, 1864)
Leucochitonea levubu Wallengren, 1857
Abantis arctomarginata Lathy, 1901
Abantis paradisea (Butler, 1870)
Abantis tettensis Hopffer, 1855
Abantis venosa Trimen & Bowker, 1889
Abantis zambesiaca (Westwood, 1874)

Carcharodini
Spialia confusa Evans, 1937
Spialia depauperata (Strand, 1911)
Spialia mafa (Trimen, 1870)
Spialia secessus (Trimen, 1891)

Hesperiinae

Aeromachini
Astictopterus stellata mineni (Trimen, 1894)
Ampittia capenas (Hewitson, 1868)
Kedestes brunneostriga (Plötz, 1884)
Kedestes lema linka Evans, 1956
Kedestes mohozutza (Wallengren, 1857)
Kedestes fenestratus (Butler, 1894)
Gorgyra bibulus Riley, 1929
Gorgyra johnstoni (Butler, 1894)
Teniorhinus harona (Westwood, 1881)
Teniorhinus herilus (Hopffer, 1855)
Xanthodisca vibius (Hewitson, 1878)
Acada biseriata (Mabille, 1893)
Parosmodes morantii (Trimen, 1873)
Acleros mackenii (Trimen, 1868)
Acleros ploetzi Mabille, 1890
Semalea arela (Mabille, 1891)
Semalea pulvina (Plötz, 1879)
Meza larea (Neave, 1910)
Andronymus caesar philander (Hopffer, 1855)
Andronymus fenestrella Bethune-Baker, 1908
Andronymus neander (Plötz, 1884)
Chondrolepis niveicornis (Plötz, 1883)
Chondrolepis telisignata (Butler, 1896)
Artitropa erinnys nyasae Riley, 1925
Artitropa reducta Aurivillius, 1925
Leona leonora dux Evans, 1937
Caenides soritia (Hewitson, 1876)
Monza punctata (Aurivillius, 1910)
Fresna nyassae (Hewitson, 1878)
Platylesches affinissima Strand, 1921
Platylesches galesa (Hewitson, 1877)
Platylesches lamba Neave, 1910
Platylesches langa Evans, 1937
Platylesches picanini (Holland, 1894)
Platylesches rasta Evans, 1937
Platylesches robustus Neave, 1910
Platylesches tina Evans, 1937

Baorini
Zenonia anax Evans, 1937
Borbo fallax (Gaede, 1916)
Borbo holtzi (Plötz, 1883)
Borbo lugens (Hopffer, 1855)
Borbo perobscura (Druce, 1912)

Heteropterinae
Metisella abdeli (Krüger, 1928)
Metisella decipiens (Butler, 1896)
Metisella formosus (Butler, 1894)
Metisella medea nyika Evans, 1937
Metisella midas (Butler, 1894)
Metisella perexcellens (Butler, 1896)
Metisella quadrisignatus (Butler, 1894)
Metisella willemi (Wallengren, 1857)

See also
Wildlife of Malawi
Geography of Malawi
List of ecoregions in Malawi

References

Seitz, A. Die Gross-Schmetterlinge der Erde 13: Die Afrikanischen Tagfalter. Plates
Seitz, A. Die Gross-Schmetterlinge der Erde 13: Die Afrikanischen Tagfalter. Text 

Malawi
Malawi
Butterflies